The 1992 Volvo Tennis/Los Angeles was a men's tennis tournament held on outdoor hardcourts at the Los Angeles Tennis Center in Los Angeles, California in the United States that was part of the World Series category of the 1992 ATP Tour. It was the 66th edition of the tournament and was held from August 3, 1992 through August 9, 1992. Second-seeded Richard Krajicek won the singles title at the event and earned $33,800 first-prize money.

Finals

Singles

 Richard Krajicek defeated  Mark Woodforde 6–4, 2–6, 6–4
 It was Krajicek's 1st and only singles title of the year and the 2nd of his career.

Doubles

 Patrick Galbraith /  Jim Pugh defeated  Francisco Montana /  David Wheaton 7–6, 7–6

See also
 1992 Virginia Slims of Los Angeles – women's tournament

References

External links
 ITF tournament edition details

Los Angeles Open
Los Angeles Open (tennis)
Los Angeles Open
Los Angeles Open
Los Angeles Open